Rajanagaram is a locality in Rajamahendravaram City. It also forms a part of Godavari Urban Development Authority.

Geography 
It has an average elevation of .It is bounded by Gandepalle Mandal towards North, Rangampeta Mandal towards East, Rajahmundry Rural Mandal towards west, Korukonda Mandal towards North.

Education 
The colleges located in and around Rajanagaram are Godavari Institute of Engineering and Technology, Adikavi Nannaya University, Aditya Engineering College, Lenora Institute of Dental Sciences etc.

References 

Villages in East Godavari district